João Nuno Figueiredo Valido (born 28 April 2001) is a Portuguese professional footballer who plays as a goalkeeper for Arouca.

Professional career
Valido is a youth product of Vitória Setúbal and Benfica. He was first called up to the senior team of Vitória Setúbal in 2019, before debuting with them in 2020. He transferred to the Primeira Liga club Arouca on 5 July 2022, signing a 3-year contract.

International career
Valido is a youth international for Portugal, having played with them up to the Portugal U20s.

Personal life
Valido was a Portuguese pentathlon champion in his youth. He has type 1 diabetes.

References

External links
 
 
 

2001 births
Living people
Sportspeople from Setúbal
Portuguese footballers
Portugal youth international footballers
F.C. Arouca players
Vitória F.C. players
Primeira Liga players
Campeonato de Portugal (league) players
Association football goalkeepers
People with type 1 diabetes